The Shanghai Restoration Project (SRP) is a Barcelona-based contemporary electronic music duo, consisting of Chinese American artists Dave Liang and Sun Yunfan.

Background 
Producer Dave Liang was born in Lawrence, Kansas and grew up in Upstate New York. He started learning classical piano at an early age but transitioned towards jazz after hearing Miles Davis' "So What" in high school. He attended college at Harvard and upon graduation moved to NYC to work as a consultant. After work he would spend his evenings looking for jazz gigs at various bars. In 2003, Liang reconnected with his college classmate Ryan Leslie, who was working as a producer with Bad Boy Records. He quit his day job and began apprenticing with Leslie, "learning his way around drum machines and mixing desks and devouring a history of hip-hop that he had missed the first time around." He sold his first song to R&B singer Carl Thomas and soon created his own group, the Shanghai Restoration Project.

Biography 
SRP debuted as MSN Music's "New Artist of the Week" in January 2006. The group's first eponymous release, inspired by the Shanghai jazz bands of the 1930s, combines traditional Chinese instruments with hip hop and electronica. The release gained recognition globally, rising to the top 10 in several electronic charts, including Amazon and iTunes. The first track from the debut album, "Introduction (1936)", was selected as the theme song for a worldwide TV advertising campaign for Kenzo Parfums (a division of Louis Vuitton) in early 2007.

In late 2007, SRP partnered with China Record Corporation (the Chinese government's record label) to release Remixed and Restored Vol. 1, a project remixing select classic Chinese hits from 1930s Shanghai.

In 2008, SRP's Instrumentals: Day & Night, a 24-song soundtrack for modern day Shanghai, was featured on NPR. Several songs were regularly featured during BBC's coverage of the Beijing Olympics.

In 2009, SRP visited Sichuan, China with Abigail Washburn to create a folk-electronic record called Afterquake to raise awareness for victims of the Sichuan earthquakes. The two artists partnered with Sichuan Quake Relief and discussed their work on NPR All Things Considered, The San Francisco Chronicle, and NY Times.

In 2010, SRP earned a New York Emmy Award for the special entertainment news coverage of "New York 360 Angle: Shanghai Restoration Project" produced by Limei Wang. That year, SRP partnered with the Chinese creative community site Neocha to release eXpo, a compilation of Chinese electronic artists that was highlighted in The Fader, Wired.com, and PRI's The World.

In 2011, SRP released Little Dragon Tales, a collection of classic Chinese children's songs set to electronic and hip-hop beats. The album was recommended by Jeff Yang as the "year’s best culture-savvy stocking stuffer" in the Wall Street Journal. Songs from the album were also featured on compilations released by Starbucks and Putumayo. That same year, Liang began collaborating with multimedia artist Sun Yunfan, first on music videos and live visuals and eventually on songwriting and music production.

In 2014, SRP released The Classics, a collection of 1930s and 1940s Shanghai jazz standards remade in an electronic format. The album features vocals from Shanghai jazz vocalist Zhang Le and was featured on both NPR's All Things Considered and Last Call with Carson Daly. The group embarked on a multi-city tour of China and performed at the Smithsonian Folklife Festival and the Toronto's Harbourfront Centre.

In 2016, SRP released What's Up with That?, an electronic collaboration with Chinese animator Lei Lei and Life Elsewhere, an album with Chinese jazz singer Zhang Le. Life Elsewhere was the first album Liang co-produced with Sun Yunfan.

In 2017, the duo released R.U.R., which imagines a world in which AI has replaced humankind. The group also contributed music to the film Have a Nice Day, which premiered in competition at the Berlin International Film Festival.

SRP is currently based in Barcelona.

Discography

Studio albums
 The Shanghai Restoration Project (2006, Undercover Culture Music)
 Instrumentals (2006, Undercover Culture Music)
 Story of a City (2008, Undercover Culture Music)
 Instrumentals: Day - Night (2008, Undercover Culture Music)
 Zodiac (2009, Undercover Culture Music)
 Expo with Neocha (2010, Undercover Culture Music & Neocha)
 Little Dragon Tales: Chinese Children's Songs (2011, Undercover Culture Music)
 Little Dragon Tales: Instrumentals (2011, Undercover Culture Music)
 Pictures in Motion (2013, Undercover Culture Music)
 The Classics with Zhang Le (2014, Undercover Culture Music)
 What's Up with That? with Lei Lei (2016, Undercover Culture Music)
 Life Elsewhere with Zhang Le (2016, Undercover Culture Music)
 R.U.R. (2017, Undercover Culture Music)
 Flashbacks in a Crystal Ball (2019, Undercover Culture Music)
Brave New World Symphony (2020, Undercover Culture Music)

EPs and singles
 "Reinterpretations" (2006, Undercover Culture Music)
 "Remixed and Restored: Vol. 1" (2007, China Records)
 "Afterquake" with Abigail Washburn (2009, Afterquake Music)
 "A Summer Song" with Emi Meyer (2010, Curious Creature Records & Undercover Culture Music)
 "A Winter Song" with Emi Meyer (2010, Curious Creature Records & Undercover Culture Music)
 "New Tea" (2011, Undercover Culture Music)
 "In a Faraway Place" with Mimi Yu (2012, Undercover Culture Music)
 "sum of all things nini" with Neocha (2012, Undercover Culture Music & Neocha)
 "Breakdance of Yao" with Brittany Haas & Lily Henley (2013, Undercover Culture Music)
 "Mungbean Mash" with Zhang Le (2015, Undercover Culture Music)
 "I Don't Like the Comics You Drew" with Lei Lei (2017, Undercover Culture Music)
 "Dubalonia Radio International" (2018, Undercover Culture Music)
 "Public Poet" (2018, Undercover Culture Music)
 "A148" (2018, Undercover Culture Music)

Other projects
The Shanghai Restoration Project has also produced releases for various artists including Japanese recording artist  MEG, Yamaha J-pop artist Miu Sakamoto, electro pop artist Di Johnston, singer-songwriter Heath Brandon, and Japanese jazz artist Emi Meyer.

MEG: Journey (Mini-Album 2009)

Miu Sakamoto: Phantom Girl (2010), Hatsukoi (2011), I'm Yours (2012)

References

External links
Band's website
NPR interview

Electronic music groups from New York (state)
Musical groups from New York City
American musicians of Chinese descent